A list of the films produced in Mexico in 1983 (see 1983 in film):

1983

External links

1983
Films
Lists of 1983 films by country or language